Castúo is the generic name for the dialects of Spanish spoken in the autonomous community of Extremadura, in Spain. Not to be confused with Extremaduran, a language between Asturleonese and Castilian, or Fala another language spoken in Extremadura which is most similar to Galician-Portuguese.

Phonology
 Frequent loss of d, in any position, as is common in Spanish varieties in the southern half of Spain.
 Simplification of the consonantic group -nf, to f
 Simplification of the consonantic group -rj, to j
 Simplification of the consonantic group rn, to nn
 Pronunciation of word-initial 'h' as a glottal fricative, in many words in which Latin had an initial 'f', as is common in most Andalusian varieties.
 Occasional consonantic change l/r and r/l, which occurs in Andalusian Spanish as well
 General loss of r in final position

Morphology
 Anteposition of article before possessive pronoun, as in Extremaduran
 Use of diminutives ino and ina, a product of contact with Leonese
 Use of masculine article er before a consonant

Writers
 José María Gabriel y Galán
 Luis Chamizo Trigueros
 Miguel Herrero Uceda
 Elisa Herrero Uceda

References
APLEx Association for the study and divulgation of Extremaduran linguistic patrimony

External links
 José María Gabriel y Galán's poems, poetry in castúo

Spanish dialects of Spain
Extremaduran culture